Torre de la Horadada is a Spanish town located on the Mediterranean Sea with an estimated population of 2.676 inhabitants and comes under the jurisdiction of Pilar de la Horadada, which in turn has a total population of 22.967 according to the National Statistics Institute. Both of these towns are located in the most southern point of the Alicante province in the southeast of Spain and therefore shares a border with the province of Murcia. The name of the town has its origin in two factors: the first, the 16th century watchtower; and the second, the site where the tower is found: the point of Horadada (el horadada) which comes from the Spanish word for "bore through" as it is situated on rocks made up of small caves developed by the water boring the rock.

Historical values 

In ancient times, the Mediterranean coast and specifically the Horadada fields suffered many pirate raids. In order to prevent this, Phillip II had a series of watchtowers built along the coast, so that they could alert villagers about the presence of pirate ships. The Horadada tower was built in 1591, although there are traces of the existence of similar constructions from ancient times and the Middle Ages. From 1905 until the present day it has been property of the counts of Roche, who transformed it into their summer residence. During the 19th century the tower was used to make signals with an optical telegraph. In December 1995 it was registered as a property of cultural significance within Spain’s Historical Heritage as a monument.

Natural values 

Enthusiasts can enjoy diving and snorkeling along Torre’s shores full of sea life. Along the coast you can find great sand banks combined with small rock formations full of marine diversity and posidonia sea grass ensuring an interesting diving experience.

Present day 

As a coastal town it has experienced a great deal of its fortune thanks to tourism and boasts various prestigious blue flag beaches, the most popular being Los Jesuitas, El Conde, and El Puerto. These local beaches are well known for their fine sand and crystal waters. Its popularity during the busy summer months means that the town’s population can quadruple in size with many visitors coming from other parts of Spain, mainly Madrid and Murcia to enjoy their summer residences.

In recent years Torre de la Horadada has become the home to many expatriate residents form northern Europe, mainly from the UK and Ireland. This has led to the all year round sustainability of the town, which has resulted in the advent of new local business and amenities such as supermarkets, bars, restaurants and the construction of a new, and modern tourism complex Lo Monte.

During the Spanish boom years of the first decade of the 21st century Torre like many other Spanish coastal towns saw an increase in the construction of homes, however in contrast to most other local towns this expansion was characterized for being steady and controlled which has safeguarded its appearance and the wellbeing of its residents. As a result, Torre has bucked the national trend for the demand of housing and still continues to have a number of construction projects currently in place, and although house prices have significantly reduced compared to the boom years they still favor considerably in relation to the national trend.

Amenities 

Although it’s a small coastal town Torre boasts various local services such as a medical center, supermarkets and two main plazas, “Pueblo Latino” and “The Square” home to a great variety of bars, restaurants and ice cream parlors meaning that all tastes and budgets are catered for.

The town is also home to a small marina of 525 moorings, which was built on a small fishing dock more than 30 years ago and has recently been a point of conflict between residents and authorities due to a proposed expansion of the port, which would endanger certain aspects of the environment as well as a negative visual impact. 	

As of June 2011 Torre is now home to a modest modern tourism complex, Lo Monte, which has three swimming pools, a gym and spa, and a bar/restaurant which provides local delicacies as well as international cuisine to both tourists and local residents. All the facilities are managed with the maximum respect for the environment and are adapted for children and disabled people. This complex adds to the touristic viability of the town, offering cozy wooden bungalows as well as plots to rent.

Also there is a Guardia Civil barracks located next to the famous watchtower from which the town takes its name.

Towns in Spain